The String Quartet in F major, Op. 96, nicknamed the American Quartet, is the 12th string quartet composed by Antonín Dvořák. It was written in 1893, during Dvořák's time in the United States. The quartet is one of the most popular in the chamber music repertoire.

Composition

Dvořák composed the quartet in 1893 during a summer vacation from his position as director (1892–1895) of the National Conservatory in New York City. He spent his vacation in the town of Spillville, Iowa, which was home to a Czech immigrant community. Dvořák came to Spillville through Josef Jan Kovařík. Kovařík had finished violin studies at the Prague Conservatory and was about to return to Spillville—his home in the United States—when Dvořák offered him a position as secretary. When Josef Jan accepted, he came to live with the Dvořák family in New York. He told Dvořák about Spillville, where his father Jan Josef was a schoolmaster, leading Dvořák to spend the summer of 1893 there.

Dvořák felt very much at ease in Spillville. Writing to a friend he described his state of mind, away from hectic New York: "I have been on vacation since 3 June here in the Czech village of Spillville and I won't be returning to New York until the latter half of September. The children arrived safely from Europe and we're all happy together. We like it very much here and, thank God, I am working hard and I'm healthy and in good spirits." He composed the quartet shortly after the New World Symphony, before that work had been performed.

Dvořák sketched the quartet in three days and completed it in thirteen more days, finishing the score with the comment "Thank God! I am content. It was fast." It was his second attempt to write a quartet in F major: his first effort, 12 years earlier, produced only one movement. The American Quartet proved a turning point in Dvořák's chamber music output: for decades he had toiled unsuccessfully to find a balance between his overflowing melodic invention and a clear structure. In the American Quartet it finally came together. Dvořák defended the apparent simplicity of the piece: "When I wrote this quartet in the Czech community of Spillville in 1893, I wanted to write something for once that was very melodious and straightforward, and dear Papa Haydn kept appearing before my eyes, and that is why it all turned out so simply. And it's good that it did."

For his symphony Dvořák gave the subtitle himself: "From the New World". To the quartet he gave no subtitle himself, but there is the comment "The second composition written in America."

Dvořák's influences
For the London premiere of his New World symphony, Dvořák wrote: "As to my opinion I think that the influence of this country (it means the folk songs as are Negro, Indian, Irish etc.) is to be seen, and that this and all other works (written in America) differ very much from my other works as well as in couleur as in character,..."

Dvořák's appreciation of African-American music is documented: Harry T. Burleigh, a baritone and later a composer, who knew Dvořák while a student at the National Conservatory, said, "I sang our Negro songs for him very often, and before he wrote his own themes, he filled himself with the spirit of the old Spirituals." Dvořák said: "In the Negro melodies of America I discover all that is needed for a great and noble school of music." For its presumed association with African-American music, the quartet was referred to with nicknames such as Negro and Nigger, before being called the American Quartet. The older nicknames, without negative connotations for the composition, were abandoned after the 1950s.

Dvořák wrote (in a letter he sent from America shortly after composing the quartet): "As for my new Symphony, the F major String Quartet and the Quintet (composed here in Spillville) – I should never have written these works 'just so' if I hadn't seen America." Listeners have tried to identify specific American motifs in the quartet. Some have claimed that the theme of the second movement is based on a Negro spiritual, or perhaps on a Kickapoo Indian tune, which Dvořák heard during his sojourn at Spillville.

A characteristic, unifying element throughout the quartet is the use of the pentatonic scale. This scale gives the whole quartet its open, simple character, a character that is frequently identified with American folk music. However, the pentatonic scale is common in many ethnic musics worldwide, and Dvořák had composed pentatonic music, being familiar with such Slavonic folk music examples, before coming to America.

Specific American influences have been doubted: "In fact the only American thing about the work is that it was written there", writes Paul Griffiths. "The specific American qualities of the so-called "American" Quartet are not easily identifiable, writes Lucy Miller, "...Better to look upon the subtitle as simply one assigned because of its composition during Dvořák's American tour."

Some have heard suggestions of a locomotive in the last movement, recalling Dvořák's love of railroads.

Dvořák quoted in the third movement, measures 21–24, a bird that he believed was a scarlet tanager, an American songbird. The song appears as a high, interrupting strain in the first violin part. Dvořák was annoyed by this bird's insistent chattering, and transcribed its song in his notebook. American ornithologist Ted Floyd showed in 2016 that the bird quoted by Dvořák likely was not a scarlet tanager; instead, the bird was probably a red-eyed vireo, another American songbird.

Structure 

The quartet is scored for the usual complement of two violins, viola, and cello, and comprises four movements: A typical performance lasts 26 to 30 minutes.

I. Allegro ma non troppo

The opening theme of the quartet  is purely pentatonic, played by the viola, with a rippling F major chord in the accompanying instruments. This same F major chord continues without harmonic change throughout the first 12 measures of the piece. The movement then goes into a bridge, developing harmonically, but still with the open, triadic sense of openness and simplicity.

The second theme, in A major, is also primarily pentatonic, but ornamented with melismatic elements reminiscent of Gypsy or Czech music. The movement moves to a development section that is much denser harmonically and much more dramatic in tempo and color.

The development ends with a fugato section that leads into the recapitulation.

After the first theme is restated in the recapitulation, there is a cello solo that bridges to the second theme.

II. Lento

The theme of the second movement  is the one that interpreters have most tried to associate with a Negro spiritual or with an American Indian tune. The simple melody, with the pulsing accompaniment in second violin and viola, does indeed recall spirituals or Indian ritual music. It is written using the same pentatonic scale as the first movement, but in the minor (D minor) rather than the major. The theme is introduced in the first violin, and repeated in the cello. Dvořák develops this thematic material in an extended middle section, then repeats the theme in the cello with an even thinner accompaniment that is alternately bowed and pizzicato.

III. Molto vivace

The third movement is a variant of the traditional scherzo. It has the form A–B–A–B–A: the A section is a sprightly, somewhat quirky tune, full of off-beats and cross-rhythms. High in the first violin there appears the song of a bird the composer believed to be a scarlet tanager; however, the song was likely not that of the tanager.

The B section is actually a variation of the main scherzo theme, played in minor, at half tempo, and more lyrical. In its first appearance it is a legato line, while in the second appearance the lyrical theme is played in triplets, giving it a more pulsing character.

IV. Finale: vivace ma non troppo

The final movement is in a traditional rondo form, A–B–A–C–A–B–A. Again, the main melody is pentatonic.

The B section is more lyrical, but continues in the spirit of the first theme.

The C section is a chorale theme.

Performance and influence

In a first private performance of the quartet, in Spillville, June 1893, Dvořák himself played first violin, Jan Josef Kovařík second violin, daughter Cecilie Kovaříková viola, and son Josef Jan Kovařík the cello.

The first two public performances of the quartet were by the Kneisel Quartet, in Boston on 1 January 1894, and then in New York City on 13 January. An unnamed reviewer wrote the next day that to be sure, "there is none of the soaring or the yearning of the mighty Beethoven", but that there is "the spirit of eternal sunshine" which is "the soul of Mozart's music". Burghauser mentions press notices in both cities, the first in the New York Herald, 18 December 1893.

While the influence of American folk song is not explicit in the quartet, the impact of Dvořák's quartet on later American compositions is clear. Following Dvořák, a number of American composers turned their hands to the string quartet genre, including John Knowles Paine, Horatio Parker, George Whitefield Chadwick, and Arthur Foote. "The extensive use of folk-songs in 20th century American music and the 'wide-open-spaces' atmosphere of 'Western' film scores may have at least some of their origins" in Dvořák's new American style, writes Butterworth.

Notes

Sources

Further reading
 Dvořák, Antonín: Quartetto XII. Fa maggiore. Score. Prague: Editio Supraphon, 1991. S 1304

External links 
 
 String Quartet No. 12 "American" at antonin-dvorak.cz

Dvorak 12
1893 compositions
Compositions in F major